

Oskar Munzel (13 March 1899 – 1 January 1992) was a general in the Wehrmacht of Nazi Germany during World War II and in the Bundeswehr of West Germany who commanded several divisions. He was a recipient of the Knight's Cross of the Iron Cross. After the war, he served as a military advisor in Egypt, and then he joined the Bundeswehr in 1956 and retired in 1962. Munzel then acted as the Chief Advisor of Ming-teh-Gruppe (German Military Advisory Group) in Taiwan for the Republic of China Armed Forces before returning to Germany.

Awards and decorations

 Knight's Cross of the Iron Cross on 16 October 1944 as Oberst and commander of 14. Panzer-Division
 Federal Cross of Merit

References

Citations

Bibliography

 
 
 

1899 births
1992 deaths
Bundeswehr generals
Major generals of the German Army (Wehrmacht)
Recipients of the Gold German Cross
Recipients of the Knight's Cross of the Iron Cross
Commanders Crosses of the Order of Merit of the Federal Republic of Germany
People from Vorpommern-Rügen
Military personnel from Mecklenburg-Western Pomerania